William Wheatley (5 November 1920 – 1965) was an English professional footballer who played in the Football League for Mansfield Town.

References

1920 births
1965 deaths
English footballers
Association football wingers
English Football League players
Nottingham Forest F.C. players
Mansfield Town F.C. players